Antonio Prior (12 August 1913 – 11 July 1961) was a Spanish racing cyclist. In 1949, he became a citizen of France. He rode in three editions of the Tour de France.

Major results
1933
 6th Overall Vuelta a la Comunidad Valenciana
1936
 1st Trofeo Masferrer
 1st Six Days of Buenos Aires (with Rafael Ramos)
1937
 2nd Overall Tour du Maroc
1st Stages 2, 4 & 10
 2nd Six Days of Buenos Aires

References

External links
 

1913 births
1961 deaths
Spanish male cyclists
Sportspeople from Murcia
Cyclists from the Region of Murcia